The gray ceiling is a business/societal phenomenon where the existing workforce of those born during the baby boom era prevents the slightly younger Generation Xers from advancing or being promoted at their jobs.

General
The gray ceiling phenomenon is most likely unintentional. Although it is true that baby boomers are staying on the job longer than previous generations, by sheer number they are also competing within their own generation and their children who are joining the workforce at the turn of the 21st century.

As the children of the baby boomers advance from below, the Gen-Xers, usually with middle management jobs, feel threatened and trapped in a job that is going nowhere and might be given away to the next younger candidate.

References
 Fisher, Anne. CNN Money. "Are you stuck in middle management hell?". Aug. 15, 2006.

Social phenomena
Cultural generations
Workforce